Miss Grand Nicaragua is an annual national women's beauty pageant in Nicaragua founded by a León-based designer "Saul Benítez" in 2020, aiming to select the country representative to compete at Miss Grand International. Formerly, throughout 2014 - 2017, the license of the contest belonged to Miss Mundo Nicaragua and Miss Nicaragua but the country representatives were either appointed or determined through the main contest of such organizations.

The first time ever Miss Grand Nicaragua was Maria Alejandra Gross Rivera from Managua. The reining Miss Grand Nicaragua is Maycrin Juliette Jaenz from León. She will represent Nicaragua at Miss Grand International 2022 in Bali, Indonesia on October 25, 2022.

Background

History
Nicaragua competed at Miss Grand International for the first time in 2014, by María Rivera, the appointed representative from Managua. In 2016, the Miss Nicaragua, headed by Karen Celebertti, had obtained the license for the 2016 – 2017, then the country representatives were elected via such a national competition. After an absence in 2018, the León-based designer Saúl Benítez later purchased the license in the following year, however, his first two affiliated titleholders – Vanessa Baldizón and Teresa Moreno – were designated without organizing the contest, both of them were the national finalists of Miss Nicaragua 2017. In 2021, Benítez ran the first contest of Miss Grand Nicaragua on 8 August at Jose de la Cruz Mena Municipal Theater of the León city, aiming to determine the country representative for the 2021 and 2022 edition of Miss Grand International. The contest consisted of 9 candidates from 7 departments, including Boaco, Granada, León, Managua, RACCN, RACCS, and Río San Juan, of which, both Managua and the RACCN was sending 2 delegates to take part. In the final round, Epifanía Solís of Managua together with Maycrin Jáenz of Granada were sequentially announced Miss Grand Nicaragua 2021 and 2022.

Since the debutant in 2014, to date, none of Nicaragua's representatives been qualified for the further round on the international stage. However, the 2021 candidate, Epifanía Solís, was placed among the top 10 best in a swimsuit competition, one of the sub-contests in  pageant.

Edition

Titleholders 

Titleholder gallery

References

External links
 Miss Grand Nicaragua in Instagram

Recurring events established in 2021
Grand Nicaragua